William David Cracknell (born 19 January 2002) is an English professional footballer who plays as a defender for  club Colchester United. He has appeared on loan for Maldon & Tiptree on three occasions and appeared for Concord Rangers on loan.

Career
Born in Brentwood, Essex, Cracknell joined Maldon & Tiptree on a work experience loan towards the end of the 2018–19 season. He made one appearance as a substitute in the Isthmian League North Division.

During the 2019–20 season, Cracknell scored twice in 32 appearances for Maldon & Tiptree. He also made appearances during the 2020–21 campaign for them.

On 29 September 2020, Cracknell was named on the first-team bench for the first time during Colchester's EFL Trophy match against West Ham United under-21s.

He made his professional debut on 2 March 2021, coming on as a late substitute for Frank Nouble during Colchester's 2–1 League Two win against Carlisle United.

He signed his first professional contract with Colchester on 4 June 2021, agreeing a one-year deal.

On 12 August 2021, he joined National League South side Concord Rangers on loan until January 2022. He made his debut on 30 August in Concord's 2–1 defeat at Welling United.

On 26 November 2021, Isthmian League Premier Division side Bishop's Stortford signed Crackell in a month-long loan deal. He made his debut in their 5–1 FA Trophy win over Leiston on 27 November.

Career statistics

References

External links

2002 births
Living people
People from Brentwood, Essex
English footballers
Association football defenders
Colchester United F.C. players
Maldon & Tiptree F.C. players
Concord Rangers F.C. players
Bishop's Stortford F.C. players
Isthmian League players
English Football League players
National League (English football) players